The Luxol Stadium is a stadium in Pembroke, Malta, opened on 26 May 2006. It was built at a cost of Lm 350,000 with an artificial turf surface and floodlighting. It is the home ground of Maltese football club St. Andrews F.C., who currently play in the Maltese FA Trophy, Maltese Second Division and Maltese Third Division. It is used for matches from the Maltese FA Trophy, Maltese Third Division, Maltese Second Division and even Exhibition game. It is also used by all the St. Andrews F.C. teams from the youth teams up until the senior teams for training. It holds 800 people on the stadium.

References

External links
 
 

Sports venues completed in 1970
Football venues in Malta
Pembroke
St. Andrews F.C.